First-party leads are sales leads that contain the contact information provided by prospective customers directly to the potential seller. These prospective customers' original connection with the potential seller is a result of a direct action by the merchant, advertiser or marketer.

"First-party leads" is a term coined by former Dealer.com CEO Mark Bonfigli and is now used widely in the automotive industry though any industry that relies in part on sales leads to connect with prospects and sell their products would be a user of First Party Leads. The term was first used in the early/mid 2000s when Dealer.com was growing from a small automotive digital marketing company to one of the largest and most used in the world. Generating first Party Leads was also coined as  “first generation” leads.

History

The term became significant and widely used as a result of marketing terminology education in website marketing for automotive car dealers in the United States.  It was believed to have been coined by Dealer.com CEO Mark Bonfigli as a term to differentiate one of the companies product advantages in mid 2004. These first-party leads were in contrast to the industry's use of "third-party leads", those contacts typically harvested from wide spectrum demographics and speculative assumption about a consumer's behavior or recent market activity. First-party leads are generated by consumers who have already in some way been "touched" by a merchant or advertiser, and as a result they desire to connect with them.

Purpose
These first-party leads and the pursuit of them have very much changed the marketplace surrounding website owners and their internet marketing efforts. Providers of technologies offering services to better harness the value of this type of contact have popped up from a variety of differing perspectives. These technologies, systems, and or simple changes in practice and policy include teaching website owners the value of conversion tactics to improve conversion rates, improve their own website return on investment, and increase revenue from e-commerce, both from automated or self driven sales to providing a mechanism that inspires a face to face interaction between an in-the-market consumer and a sales person or expert in that field.

Sometimes these visitors are the result of targeted or un-targeted advertisements that may lead to impulse buys that fulfill desires for luxury or non-essential items.  These ads might show up as banner ads, pay per click ads, social network ads and other revenue generators through ad networks and affiliate marketing.

First-party leads differ from third-party leads based on where they originate.  If they originate from the direct efforts of the website owner, then they are a first-party lead.  i.e. When someone visits the website of a merchant and dials their phone number, sees their address and drives to their location or fills out a quote request or a 'contact me' form – that is a first party lead.  When someone sees a billboard and calls the phone number, hears about a product or service on the radio and contacts the merchant as a result or sees a TV commercial and visits the website, filling out a contact form, these would all be considered first-party leads.
When someone's contact information is harvested from an email list, or purchased from a contact aggregator, or collected from an independent agent of the website owner who pairs that contact to the business based on demographics or other matchable constructs, these would all be considered third party leads.
 
A single individual shopper might show up as both.  Their contact information may find their way to the website owner through a third-party provider and as well show up as a direct result of an action the website owner took to secure that lead, such as an advertisement or website promotion or conversion tool.

There are several companies around providing services from software to full hands-on management who specialize their entire businesses on the value of, and the value of supplying or collecting first party leads for business owners.

Authorities
Matt Buchanan writes on Dealer Marketing Magazine about first party leads saying they are "those leads dealers generate from their own activities and websites"

According to Jennifer Murphy Bloodworth of Special Finance Insider Magazine, "To create first-party leads, dealers (website owners) must push consumers to their Website(s) and have effective lead submission points available on the site that entice customers to submit information."

Steve Stauning of Pladoogle, LLC. writes about first-party leads, calling them "...so addicting that you might eventually utter something nonsensical like 'I'm only focusing on first-party leads, because that's where I get the best results.'"

Mark Bonfigli, CEO of Dealer.com, a provider of websites to automotive and other industries, talks about the importance of first party leads describing them as "First-party leads, of course, are leads that you generate yourself using your Website and associated tools (pay-per-click, search engine optimization, email, and video, for example). They are more important for a couple of reasons:
 You generate them yourself, so you have more control over the quality of the leads.
 These leads have a lower cost-per-lead and cost-per-sale."

Dean Evans also of Dealer.com calls first-party leads "The Gold Standard."  In his article of the same title, Dean writes "Whatever value third-party leads may have, however, they cannot compete with first-party leads." Dean goes on to say that when evaluating these types of leads, "Though first-party leads are by far the most valuable, they are also the most affordable. Your cost-per-lead is lower and your closing rate is higher with first-party leads, period." which helps to substantiate what others in the automotive industry confirm.

In a publication about the value of these first-party leads, one of the service providers of a mechanism for attracting them formulated an instruction guide for handling these types of leads properly in order to squeeze the greatest amount of value from them.  A quote from a customer when referring to this type of lead states, "We treat these leads as valuable as someone walking through my front door.  Any of those who are less valuable are no different than someone accidentally wandering into my showroom.  And I certainly wouldn't ignore them." – Harley Davidson Dealer, Texas

Patents
In August 2006 Steve Crim of C and S Net, Inc. Filed for a US patent to protect technology specifically designed for attaining first party leads. This patent, USPTO #7,904,335 is described as a "Website Lead Generator," a more detailed explanation defines it as "An Internet marketing system which can generate a user contact information window in a non-intrusive manner. The user contact information window allows the user to enter his or her contact information, which is then transmitted to the operators of the web site so that they can contact the user at a later time."  According to Crim, this patent, which was awarded on March 8, 2011, was a long time in the works. the first known website system to generate car leads in an automated way via a website was created by Mark Bonfigli in 1996 with the first version of an automated lead generating website that later became part of the dealer.com web platform. This automated lead generating website would actually not only create a first party lead but it would follow up with a customer and update them when vehicles they were interested arrived into inventory. This was called CarFinder and FindmyCar.

References

Marketing techniques
Advertising techniques
Online advertising